Mtskheta is a district of Georgia, in the region of Mtskheta-Mtianeti. Its main town is Mtskheta. Population of Mtskheta Municipality - 47 711 inhabitants. The municipality includes one city (Mtskheta) and 63 settlements. The city is the municipal center of Mtskheta and its population is 7,940 inhabitants or 13% of the population of the municipality. The largest village is Mukhrani with 6,197 inhabitants.

Geography and climate

Mtskheta Municipality is located in Mtskheta-Mtianeti region of eastern Georgia. Its administrative center is the city of Mtskheta. The municipality is bordered by Sagarejo Municipality to the east, Kaspi Municipality to the west, Dusheti and Tianeti to the north, Gardabani and Tetritskaro municipalities and also Tbilisi to the south. The region is characterized by a variety of natural conditions. The territory of Mtskheta is a low and mid-mountain region. In its southern part, the Saguramo Ridge is carved, to the south-east is raised the Satskepela Ridge. Its eastern end is called the Armazi Range, which is 1125 m high. There is a hillock of Skhaltbi between the rivers Ksani and Aragvi.

One of the main morphological elements of the municipality is the plain of Mukhrani-Saguramo. The Mtkvari River flows on the territory of the district, the main tributaries of which are: Khekordzula, Aragvi, and Dighmistskali. There are also lakes in the region. Mtskheta is distinguished by its diversity of flora and fauna. Saguramo Nature Reserve includes Caucasian deer, Capreolus, brown bear, wolf, fox, lynx, rabbit, otter, and more. There is a moderately humid subtropical climate in Mtskheta municipality. There is a moderately humid climate with hot summers and cold winters on Mukhrani-Saguramo plain. The average annual air temperature is 10.8 °C and -1.1 °C in January. On the ridges of Skhaltbi and Saguramo, there are mild cold winters and long warm summers.

History
The area was still inhabited during the Bronze Age, as indicated by the settlements of Samtavro, Tsitsamuri, Narekvavi, and other settlements. From the beginning of the I millennium BC, the great shifts characteristic of the life of the largest political entity in the East have also reflected on the history of Mtskheta. The strong cultural invasion of Mtskheta significantly affected the life of the city until the III-IV centuries. According to legend, the city was founded by the ethnarch Mtskhetos. From the end of the IV century, BC Mtskheta was the political center of the newly created Kartli (Iberian) kingdom. According to legend, Nino, a missionary from Jerusalem, preached Christianity in Mtskheta at the beginning of the IV century. In 326, Mirian III adopted a new religion and Christianity became the state religion. According to legend, by the prayer of St. Nino hurricanes and hail broke out and crushed Armazian idols.

At the beginning of the VI century, Dachi Ujarmeli moved the capital from Mtskheta to Tbilisi. Mtskheta has lost its political significance, though it has remained a religious center. In the early medieval period, there was an active rebuilding of cult buildings in the city. Samtavro, Jvari, Antioch, and more were built during this period. In 736–738, the Arab Commander-Marwan the deaf raided the city and destroyed Armazi Fortress. At the beginning of the XV century, it was destroyed by Temur lang. The importance of Mtskheta gradually diminished and after the accession of the Kingdom of Kartli to Russia, it was a small village in the Dusheti Mazra. Mtskheta became a separate district in 1930–34, today it has the status of a city and a municipality.

Politics

Mtskheta Municipal Assembly (Georgian: მცხეთის საკრებულო) is a representative body in Mtskheta Municipality. currently consisting of 27 members. The council is assembled into session regularly, to consider subject matters such as code changes, utilities, taxes, city budget, oversight of city government, and more. Mtskheta sakrebulo is elected every four years. The last election was held in October 2021.

Cultural monuments

 Svetitskhoveli
 Jvari Monastery
 Samtavro Monastery
 Ksani fortress
 Armazi Settlement
 Shio-mghvime Monastery Complex
 Pompey bridge
 Armazi St.Mary's Church
 Armazistsikhe-Bagineti

Demography

Villages of Mtskheta Municipality 

 Arashenda, 
 Agdgomliantkari, 
 Akhaldaba, 
 Akhali Nichbisi, 
 Akhalsopeli, 
 Akhalubani, 
 Bevreti, 
 Bitsmendi, 
 Buriani, 
 Galavani, 
 Gorovani, 
 Ereda, 
 Vaziani, 
 Vardisubani, 
 Zakaro, 
 Zemo Nichbisi, 
 Tezami, 
 Karsanobi, 
 Lelubani, 
 Lisi, 
 Mamkoda, 
 Misaktsieli, 
 Mskhaldidi, 
 Mukhatgverdi, 
 Mukhattskaro, 
 Mukhrani, 
 Mshralkhevi, 
 Navdaraantkari, 
 Navazi, 
 Natakhtari, 
 Patara Kanda, 
 Saguramo, 
 Satovle, 
 Saskhori, 
 Skhaltba, 
 Tabaruki, 
 Kupurisi, 
 Kvebrisi, 
 Krevisri, 
 Shankevani, 
 Chardakhi, 
 Tsikhisdziri, 
 Tskhvarichamia, 
 Dzalantkhevi, 
 Dzalisi, 
 Dzegvi, 
 Old Kanda, 
 Tserovani, 
 Tsilkani, 
 Tsinamdzgviantkari, 
 Tsitsamuri, 
 Tsodoreti, 
 Chilaantkari, 
 Khekordzi, 
 Jighaura

Twin towns – sister Municipalities

 Fındıklı, Turkey

 Irpin, Ukraine 
 Kuldīga, Latvia
 Leuville-sur-Orge, France
 Myrhorod, Ukraine
 Nesebar, Bulgaria
 Pereiaslav, Ukraine
 Ružinov (Bratislava), Slovakia
 Svietlahorsk, Belarus
 Trakai, Lithuania
 Ünye, Turkey
 Vagharshapat, Armenia

See also
 List of municipalities in Georgia (country)

References

External links
 Districts of Georgia, Statoids.com

Municipalities of Mtskheta-Mtianeti